López is an Argentinian locality and town in the San Jerónimo Department within the Santa Fe Province.

It is situated 100 km from the capital of the province, Santa Fe.

The commune was founded on 20 May 1896.

Population 
It has 1,535 inhabitants (INDEC, 2010), an increase of 1,467 inhabitants (INDEC, 2001) over the last census.

Geographic location 
López is the head of its communal district. Its area covers 13,000 hectares.

The limits are: at the North Santa Clara de la Buena Vista. At the east, Loma Alta. And at the south Campo Piaggio and Loma Alta.

Colonization 
The first colonists who settled the colony were tenants of Mariano López.
They were immigrants from the North of Italy, mostly from Piedmont.

The first general census of Santa Fe, taken in July 1887 confirmed that López population came from:

Sports 
The football club of the town is the Argentinian Athletic Club of López that competes in the Football League of Esperanza.

References

External links 
 Province site
 Federal Institute of Municipal Affairs
 Geographical Coordinates

Populated places in Santa Fe Province
Populated places established in 1896